The 2012 Proton Malaysian Open was a professional men's tennis tournament played on hard courts. It was the fourth edition of the tournament, and part of the 2012 ATP World Tour. It took place in Kuala Lumpur, Malaysia between 24 and 30 September 2012. Juan Mónaco won the singles title.

Singles main-draw entrants

Seeds

 1 Rankings are as of 17 September 2012

Other entrants
The following players received wildcards into the singles main draw:
  Philip Davydenko
  Ariez Elyaas Deen Heshaam
  Jimmy Wang

The following players received entry from the qualifying draw:
  Riccardo Ghedin
  Dominic Inglot
  Julian Knowle
  Michael Yani

The following player received entry as lucky loser:
  Sanam Singh

Withdrawals
  Marcos Baghdatis
  Santiago Giraldo
  Martin Kližan (oblique muscle injury)
  Sam Querrey
  Andreas Seppi (fatigue)

Retirements
  Nikolay Davydenko
  Jürgen Melzer (left quadriceps injury)

ATP doubles main-draw entrants

Seeds

 Rankings are as of 17 September 2012

Other entrants
The following pairs received wildcards into the doubles main draw:
  Mohd Assri Merzuki /  Syed Mohammad Agil Naguib
  Si Yew Ming /  Jimmy Wang

The following pair received entry as alternates:
  Vasek Pospisil /  Sanam Singh

Withdrawals
  Jürgen Melzer (left quadriceps injury)

Retirements
  Martin Kližan (oblique muscle injury)

Finals

Singles

  Juan Mónaco defeated  Julien Benneteau 7–5, 4–6, 6–3

Doubles

  Alexander Peya /  Bruno Soares defeated  Colin Fleming /  Ross Hutchins, 5–7, 7–5, [10–7]

External links
 Official website

Proton Malaysian Open
Proton Malaysian Open
2012 in Malaysian tennis